George Edgar Dennes (181727 March 1871) was an English solicitor and plant collector.

Life
George Edgar Dennes, the son of George and Ann Dennes, was baptised in Soham, Cambridgeshire, on 27 March 1817, although at least one other source suggests that he was born in Australia.

Dennes was by profession a solicitor with a passion for botany, with his plant collections from England today held in British museums. Embroiled in intrigue around the financial mismanagement of the Botanical Society of London, a precursor to the Botanical Society of Britain and Ireland, Dennes travelled to the Vancouver Island Colony of western Canada in 1860. However, he continued to have difficulties with money and was the colony's first solicitor to be struck off, for multiple contempts due to bankruptcy in 1866. He returned to London soon after, before again embarking a ship in early 1867 to the Colony of Victoria. He arrived in Melbourne in June 1867 and was registered as a solicitor in the following year, advertising as a "Solicitor for the Insolvent" in the local papers. In January 1871 he was admitted to the Yarra Bend Asylum and died, aged 53, in March that year from "disease of the brain and lungs."

Standard author abbreviation

Legacy 
The extinct vascular plant extinct plant Vicia dennesiana H.C. Watson was named in his honour. 
According to a recollection of a conversation with Watson, over 40 years after his death, it was claimed that Watson had not named after Dennes in recognition of his service to the Society as honorary secretary from 1837 until the club folded in November 1856. Instead, Britten claimed that the sudden disappearance of the plant mirrored Dennes' sudden disappearance from England after the collapse of the Society in 1856. His sudden departure from London and not being seen again is what allegedly inspired Watson to name the plant after him.

References

1817 births
1871 deaths
English naturalists
Plant collectors
People from Soham